Ramacciotti is an Italian surname, with a direct etymological root from Latin ramus/rami (arm or branch and similar derivatives) in various regional dialects. Amongst other individuals, the surname may refer to:

Francis Ramacciotti (1835-1894), inventor and a piano string manufacturer
Giovanni Battista Ramacciotti (1628–1671), Italian painter
Luis Ramacciotti (born 1886), Italian-Argentine sculptor

 Lorenzo Ramaciotti (born 1948), Italian car designer
 Gustave Ramaciotti (1861–1927), Australian law clerk, theatrical manager, and soldier
 Vera Ramaciotti (1891–1982), Australian philanthropist, sister of Clive Ramaciotti
 Clive Ramaciotti (1883–1967), Australian philanthropist, brother of Vera Ramaciotti

 Luis Alberto Ramacciotti- Italian-Argentine - 1980 - Asesor Ejecutivo-  In Ramacciotti Company by [Lara Trinidad]